Hypoxylon is a genus of ascomycetes commonly found on dead wood, and usually one of the earliest species to colonise dead wood. A common European species is Hypoxylon fragiforme which is particular common on dead trunks of beech.

Based on morphological studies and gene sequence analyses, 27 species formerly assigned to Hypoxylon sect. Annulata were reassigned to a new genus called Annulohypoxylon in 2005.

Research in Iran has shown the potential of some species of Hypoxylon in producing chemicals that are antagonistic against the disease Ash dieback.

Use in the cultivation of Tremella fuciformis 
Some species in the genus Hypoxylon may be used in the cultivation of Tremella fuciformis, one of the foremost medicinal and culinary fungi of China and Taiwan.

Tremella fuciformis is a parasitic yeast that does not form an edible fruitbody without parasitizing another fungus. Its preferred host, formerly known as Hypoxylon archeri, was moved to the closely related genus Annulohypoxylon and is now known as Annulohypoxylon archeri. Cultivators usually pair cultures of Tremella fuciformis with this species, but mushroom cultivation books written before the new genus was created suggest other Hypoxylon species may be used.

Gallery

See also 
 Tremella fuciformis

References

External links 

 Index Fungorum
 Page with extensive information on the Hypoxylon genus
 Pyrenomycetes from southwestern France

Xylariales
Taxa named by Jean Baptiste François Pierre Bulliard
Sordariomycetes genera